Heart of Darkness is the third and final full-length album from the band Burnt by the Sun, released on Relapse Records.

Track-listing

Personnel
Michael Olender - vocals
John Adubato - guitars
Chris Rascio - guitars
Ted Patterson - bass
Dave Witte - drums

Production
Produced by Eric Rachel & Burnt by the Sun
Engineered By Eric Rachel
Mastered By Eric Rachel
Artwork design by Orion Landau

References

Burnt by the Sun (band) albums
2009 albums
Relapse Records albums